is a Japanese astronomer and co-discoverer of 5239 Reiki and 27748 Vivianhoette, two main-belt asteroids he first observed together with astronomer Osamu Muramatsu at the Yatsugatake South Base Observatory  near Hokuto, Yamanashi, in 1990 and 1991.

The asteroids were named for Japanese amateur astronomer Reiki Kushida and American Vivian Hoette from the U.S. Yerkes Observatory, respectively.

References
 

20th-century Japanese astronomers
Living people
Discoverers of asteroids
Year of birth missing (living people)